British Muhajirs are British citizens or residents who are of Muhajir origin. They comprise a sizable segment of the British Pakistani community.

Demographics
The total Muhajir population in the United Kingdom is believed to be 269,000, according to the 2011 census. They are the most educated Pakistani diaspora in United Kingdom.

Politics 
British Muhajirs are a politically active ethnic group, with the largest Muhajir nationalist party being based in London and its leader living in London. MQM has registered itself as a company in UK. British Muhajirs, such as Altaf Hussain, exercise great political power in Pakistan.

Notable People 
 Sadiq Khan
 Altaf Hussain
 Imran Farooq

Notes

References

Muhajir culture
Muhajir communities
Muhajir diaspora
Muhajir people